The 2017–18 Liga IV was the 76th season of the Liga IV, the fourth tier of the Romanian football league system. The champions of each county association play against one from a neighboring county in a playoff to gain promotion. From this season the counties were divided into 7 regions, each consisting of 6 counties and the draw was made on 28 February 2018, with 3 months and a half before the first matches.

Promotion play-off 

The matches are scheduled to be played on 16, 23 and 30 June 2018.

|-
|colspan="3" style="background-color:#97DEFF"|Region 1 (North-East)
|colspan="2" style="background-color:#97DEFF"|
||0–1||0–1
||w/o||w/o
||5–0||1–0
|-
|colspan="3" style="background-color:#97DEFF"|Region 2 (North-West)
|colspan="2" style="background-color:#97DEFF"|
 ||0–0||2–0
||6–0||4–2
||w/o||w/o
|-
|colspan="3" style="background-color:#97DEFF"|Region 3 (Center)
|colspan="2" style="background-color:#97DEFF"|
||1–0||2–0
||w/o||w/o
||2–0||1–3
|-
|colspan="3" style="background-color:#97DEFF"|Region 4 (West)
|colspan="2" style="background-color:#97DEFF"|
||0–1||2–1
||4–0||3–0 (forfait)
||5–0||6–0
|-
|colspan="3" style="background-color:#97DEFF"|Region 5 (South-West)
|colspan="2" style="background-color:#97DEFF"|
||8–0||1–0
 ||2–1||1–0
||w/o||w/o
|-
|colspan="3" style="background-color:#97DEFF"|Region 6 (South)
|colspan="2" style="background-color:#97DEFF"|
||1–1||2–4
||0–7||1–10
||5–1||1–1
|-
|colspan="3" style="background-color:#97DEFF"|Region 7 (South-East)
|colspan="2" style="background-color:#97DEFF"|
||2–2||0–3
||0–3||1–5
||0–4||4–3
|}

County leagues

Alba County

Arad County

Argeș County

Bacău County

Bihor County

Bistrița-Năsăud County

Botoșani County

Brașov County

Brăila County

Championship play-off  
The teams started the championship play-off with half of the points accumulated in the regular season.

Championship play-out  
The teams started the championship play-out with half of the points accumulated in the regular season.

Bucharest

Regular season

Championship play-off  
The championship play-off played in a single round-robin tournament between the best four teams of the regular season. The teams started the play-off with the following points: 1st place – 3 points, 2nd place – 2 points, 3rd place – 1 point, 4th place – 0 points.

Buzău County

Relegation play-off  
The 14th and 15th-placed teams of Liga IV Buzău faces the 2nd-placed teams in the two series of Liga V Buzău.

Caraș-Severin County

Călărași County

Cluj County

Constanța County

Covasna County

Dâmbovița County

Dolj County

Championship play-off  
At the end of the regular season, the first four teams will play a Championship play-off and the winners crowned as county champions and qualify to the promotion play-off to Liga III. The teams will start the play-off with the number of points gained in the regular season only against the other qualified teams.

League Cup  
The teams which was ranked 5th to 12th places in the regular season played in the League Cup to establish the final standings. In the League Cup, each tie was played on a home-and-away two-legged basis. If tied on aggregate, the away goals rule was used.

First round 
First Leg: 5 and 6 May. 
Second Leg: 11 and 12 May.

|-
||2–5||0–9
||7–2||2–1
||0–4||0–3
||1–4||0–1
|}

Second round 
First Leg: 19 May. 
Second Leg: 26 May.

5-8 places 

|-
||1–1||1–6
||4–3||0–1
|}

9-12 places 

|-
||4–4||1–5
||5–3||2–3
|}

Third round 
First Leg: 2 June. 
Second Leg: 8 and 10 June.

5-6 places 

|-
||1–2||1–3
|}

7-8 places 

|-
||8–1||8–5
|}

9-10 places 

|-
||5–3||3–4
|}

11-12 places 

|-
||6–1||0–3
|}

Galați County

Giurgiu County

South Series

North Series

Championship play-off  
The championship play-off played between the best two ranked teams in each series of the regular season. All matches were played at Comunal Stadium in Bolintin-Deal on 5 and 7 June 2018, the semifinals and 10 June 2018, the final.

Semi-finals

Final 

Singureni won the 2017–18 Liga IV Giurgiu County and qualify to promotion play-off in Liga III.

Gorj County

Harghita County

Hunedoara County

Ialomița County

Iași County

Ilfov County

Seria 1

Seria 2

Championship final  
The Championship final played between the winners of the two series.

||0–1||0–5
|}
Bragadiru won the 2017–18 Liga IV Ilfov County and qualify to promotion play-off in Liga III.

Maramureș County

South Series

North Series

Championship final  
The championship final was played between the winners of the two series on 10 and 16 June 2018.

Minaur Baia Mare won the 2017–18 Liga IV Maramureș County and qualify to promotion play-off in Liga III.

Mehedinți County

Championship play-off

Championship play-out

Mureș County

Neamț County

Championship play-off  
The championship play-off tournament between the best four teams played in a double round-robin tournament and the winner declared county champion and qualify for the  promotion play-off to Liga III. The teams started with half of the points accumulated in the regular season.

Olt County

Prahova County

Satu Mare County

Sălaj County

Sibiu County

Suceava County

Teleorman County

Timiș County

Tulcea County

Serie A

Serie B

Championship play-off

Vaslui County

Relegation play-off

First round

Second round

Promotion/relegation play-off

Championship play-off

Quarter-finals

Semi-finals

Final 

Flacăra Muntenii de Sus won the 2017–18 Liga IV Vaslui and qualify to promotion play-off in Liga III.

Vâlcea County

Relegation play-off  
The 9th and 10th-placed teams of Liga IV Vâlcea faces the 2nd-placed teams in the two series of Liga V Vâlcea.

Vrancea County

Group A

Group B

Group C

Possible qualification to championship play-off  
At the end of the regular season, a special table was made between 3rd places from the three series. The best two teams in this table was qualify in the championship play-off.

Championship play-off

See also
 2017–18 Liga I
 2017–18 Liga II
 2017–18 Liga III

References

External links
 FRF

Liga IV seasons
4
Romania